Kingsley Heights is a suburb of the city of Upper Hutt, located in the lower North Island of New Zealand. The suburb stands on a hill east of and overlooking the city centre, but has also started expanding into an adjacent valley.

All of the street names in the suburb have a British royalty theme. One example is King Charles Drive, the only road leading into the suburb, which is named after Charles II of England.

This suburb houses drinking-water storage tanks for Upper Hutt.

Demographics
Kingsley Heights is included in the Upper Hutt Central statistical area.

References

Suburbs of Upper Hutt